James Douglas Aikin (born 1948) is an American science fiction writer based in Livermore, California. He is also a music technology writer, an interactive fiction writer, freelance editor and writer, cellist, and teacher. He frequently writes articles for various music industry magazines, including Electronic Musician, Keyboard Magazine, and Mix.

Aikin sold his first fiction story to Fantasy & Science Fiction where it appeared in the February 1981 issue.

Bibliography
All titles listed chronologically.

Short works
Cleaving, Amazing, November 1984
Statues, Isaac Asimov's Science Fiction Magazine, November 1984
Dance for the King, Omni, November 1984
My Life in the Jungle, Fantasy & Science Fiction, February 1985
A Place to Stay for a Little While, Isaac Asimov's Science Fiction Magazine, 1986
Dancing Among Ghosts, Fantasy & Science Fiction, February 1988
Run! Run!, Fantasy & Science Fiction, September 2008
An Elvish Sword of Great Antiquity, Fantasy & Science Fiction, January 2009
Leaving the Station, Asimov's Science Fiction, December 2009

Collections
Beyond Armageddon (1985, "My Life in the Jungle")
The Year’s Best Fantasy Stories 13 (1987, "A Place to Stay for a Little While")
The Omni Book of Science Fiction 6 (1989, "Dance for the King")
The Year’s Best Fantasy: Second Annual Collection (1989, "Dancing Among Ghosts")

Novels
Walk the Moons Road (May 1985, Del Rey)
The Wall at the Edge of the World (March 1993, Ace Books)

Interactive fiction
Not Just an Ordinary Ballerina (1999)
Last Resort (2006)
Lydia's Heart (2007)
Mrs. Pepper's Nasty Secret (2008, with Eric Eve)
April in Paris (2008)
A Flustered Duck (2009; winner of the Spring Thing)
The Only Possible Prom Dress (2022)

Non-fiction works
Power Tools for Synthesizer Programming (January 2004, Backbeat Books)
A Player's Guide to Chords & Harmony (June 2004, Backbeat Books)
Picture Yourself Playing Cello (2012, Course Technology)
Csound Power! (2013, Course Technology)

As editor
The Guide To MIDI Orchestration (3rd Edition, August 2004, Musicworks Atlanta)
Real World Digital Audio (2005-11-30, Peachpit Press)

Sources:

References

External links

1948 births
Date of birth missing (living people)
20th-century American novelists
20th-century American male writers
21st-century American novelists
American cellists
American male novelists
American science fiction writers
American male short story writers
Interactive fiction writers
Living people
The Magazine of Fantasy & Science Fiction people
Musicians from the San Francisco Bay Area
Writers from California
20th-century American short story writers
21st-century American short story writers
21st-century American male writers